The Unión General de Trabajadores (UGT, General Union of Workers) is a major Spanish trade union, historically affiliated with the Spanish Socialist Workers' Party (PSOE).

History 
The UGT was founded 12 August 1888 by Pablo Iglesias Posse in Mataró (Barcelona), with Marxist socialism as its ideological basis, despite its statutory apolitical status. Until its nineteenth Congress in 1920, it did not consider class struggle as a basic principle of trade union action. Being a member of the UGT implies an affiliation to the PSOE and vice versa.

During World War I era, the UGT followed a tactical line of close relationship and unity of action with the Confederación Nacional del Trabajo (CNT, National Labour Confederation). The UGT grew rapidly after 1917, and by 1920 had 200,000 members. This era came to a sudden end with the advent of the dictatorship of Miguel Primo de Rivera, who gave a legal monopoly on labor organizing to his own government-sponsored union. While the CNT opted for a radical confrontation with the regime and were prohibited on this account, the UGT, although in disagreement with the dictatorship, adopted a collaborative attitude in order to continue to operate legally. The UGT grew from 277,011 in December 1930, to 958,451 in December 1931, to 1,041,539 in June 1932. Much of this growth occurred in its land workers' federation, the Federación Nacional de Trabajadores de la Tierra (FNTT), which grew from 36,639 in June 1930 to 392,953 in June 1932, raising the proportion of land workers in the UGT from 13 percent to 37 percent. The influx of these workers (jornaleros) caused the union's radicalisation, and the bloody breakout of the Spanish Civil War deepened the internal fissures that resulted in the departure of Largo Caballero from the position of UGT secretary general in 1937.

General Francisco Franco confined the UGT to exile and clandestinity after his victory in the Spanish Civil War until his death in 1975. The Union emerged from secrecy during the democratic transition after Franco's death, as did the communist Workers' Commissions (Comisiones Obreras, CCOO). The UGT and CCOO, between them, constitute the major avenues for workers' representation in today's Spain, with the anarcho-syndicalist Confederación General del Trabajo (CGT) a distant third.

Objectives 
The UGT declares itself to be an institution of productive workers, organized along lines of trades and liberal professions, which respects freedom of thought, leading toward the transformation of the society, in order to establish it on the basis of social justice, equality and solidarity.

Federations and foundations

Current affiliates

The Unión de Trabajadores por Cuenta Propia (UTCP, Union of Self-Employed Workers) is not an organism of UGT. It is a bottom-up association, formed by the farmers' union UPA and the professional and autonomous workers' union, UPTA, who united in this manner to enhance their representation inside the Union and to form a united front on factional issues where they have common interests.

Former affiliates

See also 

 Pablo Iglesias, founder of both the UGT and the Spanish Socialist Workers' Party
 Ferrol, birthplace of both Francisco Franco (1892) and Pablo Iglesias (1850)

References 

 Much of the content of this article comes from the equivalent Spanish-language Wikipedia article, accessed 11 April 2005.

External links 

 UGT – Unión General de Trabajadores – UGT website
 UGT – Unión General de Trabajadores-Federación Española Trabajadores de la Enseñanza de Castilla y León – FETE-UGT CyL website
 Portal del Transporte de la Sección Sindical de UGT 
 Unió General de Treballadors de Catalunya Catalan autonomous region's UGT (from Wikipedia in Catalan)
 Small history of the UGT in Catalonia Workers at the Center of Mataró and the 1888 Congress of the Barcelona.
 História del sindicato – History of the union

Trade unions in Spain
National federations of trade unions
International Trade Union Confederation
European Trade Union Confederation
Trade unions established in 1888
Spanish Revolution of 1936